International DeeJay Gigolo Records is a German electronic music record label run by techno artist DJ Hell (real name Helmut Geier). The label was founded in Munich in 1996 by DJ Hell and DJ Upstart as an affiliate of label Disko B. It is Germany's most successful electronic music record label, specialising in electro, house and techno with 80's pop and disco influences. "Gigolo" has released records by Dave Clarke, Jeff Mills, DJ Hell, David Carretta, Miss Kittin & The Hacker, Kiko & Gino S., DJ Naughty, The Penelopes, The Advent, Dopplereffekt, Terrence Fixmer, Japanese Telecom, Fischerspooner, Tiga, Belgian Dj Valium, Princess Superstar and Vitalic. In particular, the label is widely credited as being the germ cell of the electroclash music genre in the late 1990s.

Gigolo's most successful release came in 2001, with Vitalic's Poney EP (which included techno favourite "La Rock 01" on the B-side). This EP was remastered and re-issued in 2006. The label also releases showcase compilations, sometimes called "We Are Gigolo", of which there are now twelve volumes. After several successful years in Munich, Hell temporarily moved the label's office to Berlin in the mid-2000s.

Artists

Amanda Lepore
Acid Maria
Activator
Anthony Shake Shakir
Arbotique
Atomizer
The Advent
Bookhouse Boys
Bostitch
Bobby Konders
Capri
Christopher Just
Chris Korda
Crossover
Dave Clarke
David Carretta
Der Zyklus
Dj Klash
Digitaria
Dibaba
DMX Krew
Dynamik Bass System
Elbee Bad
Electric Indigo
Erotek/Atwil
Filippo Naughty Moscatello
Fat Truckers
Fischerspooner
Foremost Poets
Gabe Castanzaro
Gino S.
Hell
Hrdvsion
Inform3r
Japanese Telecom
Jonzon
Jor-El
Jeff Mills
k.lakizz
Kevin Gorman
Kiko
Kiko & Gino S.
Kikumoto Allstars
Le Chic
Linda Lamb
M.F.F.
Makossa & Megablast
Martin Matiske
Mixmaster Jeff Monday
Mick Willis
Mihai Popoviciu
Mike Perras
Miss Kittin & The Hacker
Milch
Mitsu
Mount Sims
Oliver Ton
Orlando Voorn
Ozone Layer
Plastique de Reve
Princess Superstar
Psychonauts
Poladroid
Réplica
Richard Bartz
Rok
Romina Cohn
Savas Pascalidis
Seelenluft
Skwerl
Sonja Mooncar
Station Rose
Stalker 7
Steril
Superstars of Love
Sylvie Marks
Tampopo
Terence Fixmer
Tiga
Traxx & Deecoy
Trike
The Trinity
The Penelopes
Tuxedomoon
Dj Valium
Vitalic
Zombie Nation

See also 
 List of record labels

References

External links
 Official site

German record labels
Electronic music record labels
Record labels established in 1996
Techno record labels